Beallsville or Bealsville can refer to a location in the United States:

Bealsville, Florida
Beallsville, Maryland
Beallsville, Ohio
Beallsville, Pennsylvania